Muttur may refer to:
Muthur (commonly transliterated as Muttur) town in Kangeyam taluk in Tirupur district, Tamil Nadu, India.
Muttur (Sri Lanka)
Kannadiga village Mattur